For Your Pleasure is the second album by English rock band Roxy Music, released by Island Records in 1973. It was their last to feature synthesiser and sound specialist Brian Eno.

Production
The group was able to spend more studio time on this album than on their debut, combining strong song material by Bryan Ferry with more elaborate production treatments. For example, the song "In Every Dream Home a Heartache" (Ferry's sinister ode to a blow-up doll) fades out in its closing section, only to fade in again with all the instruments subjected to a pronounced phasing treatment. The title track fades out in an elaborate blend of tape loop effects. Brian Eno remarked that the eerie "The Bogus Man", with lyrics about a sexual stalker, displayed similarities with contemporary material by the krautrock group Can.

Of the more upbeat numbers on the album, "Do the Strand" and "Editions of You" were both based around insistent rhythms in the tradition of the band's first single "Virginia Plain". "Do the Strand" has been called the archetypal Roxy Music anthem, whilst "Editions of You" was notable for a series of ear-catching solos by Andy Mackay (saxophone), Eno (VCS3), and Phil Manzanera (guitar).

Eno is very present in the final song from the album "For Your Pleasure", making it unlike any other song on the album. The song ends with the voice of Judi Dench saying "You don't ask. You don't ask why" amid tapes of the opening vocals ('Well, how are you?') from "Chance Meeting" from the first Roxy Music album. A live recording of the song has been used in 1975 as a B-side to "Both Ends Burning".

The original UK LP cover credits "Produced by Chris Thomas and Roxy Music" for the entire album, but only the side one label repeats that; the side two label credits "Produced by John Anthony and Roxy Music". Various foreign editions and reissues have confused the matter with random variations.

Promotion
For Your Pleasure was originally released by Island Records in the United Kingdom and Warner Bros. Records in the United States. It has been subsequently reissued by Polydor Records in the UK and Atco Records and Reprise Records in the US.

As with the debut Roxy Music album, no UK singles were lifted from For Your Pleasure upon its initial release. The non-album single "Pyjamarama", backed with "The Pride and the Pain", was issued in advance of the album in Britain, peaking at number 10 on the UK Singles Chart. "Do the Strand", backed with "Editions of You", was released as a single in the US and Europe; it was finally issued as a UK single in 1978 to promote Roxy Music's Greatest Hits album, released in December the previous year.

The cover photo, taken by Karl Stoecker, featured Bryan Ferry's girlfriend at the time, singer and model Amanda Lear, who was also the confidante, protégée and closest friend of the surrealist artist Salvador Dalí. Lear was depicted posing in a skintight leather dress leading a black panther on a leash. The image has been described as "as famous as the album itself". Original pressings of the album featured a gatefold sleeve picturing the band members, except bassist John Porter, posing with guitars. Porter was credited as a "Guest artiste" in the credits, but joined the band for the subsequent tour.

Critical reception

For Your Pleasure made No. 4 in UK charts in 1973. In 1973, Paul Gambaccini of Rolling Stone gave it a mixed review, and wrote that "the bulk of For Your Pleasure is either above us, beneath us, or on another plane altogether."

In 2000, Q placed For Your Pleasure at number 33 on its list of the "100 Greatest British Albums Ever". It placed at number 87 on Pitchforks 2004 list of the top 100 albums of the 1970s. The citation notes that Morrissey told the British press that "he could 'only think of one truly great British album'... For Your Pleasure." In 2003, For Your Pleasure was ranked number 394 on Rolling Stones list of the 500 greatest albums of all time, with the album's ranking dropping to number 396 in the 2012 update of the list, and climbing to number 351 in the 2020 update.  NME ranked For Your Pleasure at number 88 on its 2013 list of 500 greatest albums of all time and called it "the pinnacle of English art rock." Classic Rock named it as one of 10 "essential" glam rock albums. Happy Mag included the album in its list of "10 records to introduce you to the world of art-rock" and called it "an art-pop, glam-rock masterpiece."

Track listing

PersonnelRoxy Music Bryan Ferry – vocals, keyboards
 Brian Eno – VCS3 synthesizer and tapes
 Andy Mackay – oboe, saxophone
 Phil Manzanera – electric guitar
 Paul Thompson – drums
 John Porter – bass guitar (credited as "Guest artiste")Production'
 Chris Thomas, John Anthony, Roxy Music – record producers
 Roxy Music – musical arrangers
 John Middleton – sound engineer
 John Punter – sound engineer
 Jennings – crew    
 Bryan Ferry – art direction, cover art concept  
 Karl Stoecker – photography
 Nicholas Deville – art direction, photography
 CCS – artwork
 Antony Price – clothing/wardrobe, make-up, hair stylist
 Smile – hair stylist 
 Amanda Lear – cover star
 Bob Ludwig – digital remastering

Charts

Certifications

References

External links
 Viva Roxy Music
 Roxyrama 
 Phil Manzanera's Roxy Music Archive

1973 albums
Roxy Music albums
Albums produced by Chris Thomas (record producer)
Albums produced by John Anthony (record producer)
Albums produced by Phil Manzanera
Albums produced by Brian Eno
Island Records albums
Warner Records albums
Polydor Records albums
Atco Records albums
Reprise Records albums
Virgin Records albums
E.G. Records albums
Albums recorded at AIR Studios